Xerox Holdings Corporation (also known simply as Xerox) is an American corporation that sells print and digital document products and services in more than 160 countries. Xerox is headquartered in Norwalk, Connecticut (having moved from Stamford, Connecticut, in October 2007), though it is incorporated in New York with its largest population of employees based around Rochester, New York, the area in which the company was founded. The company purchased Affiliated Computer Services for $6.4 billion in early 2010. As a large developed company, it is consistently placed in the list of Fortune 500 companies.

On December 31, 2016, Xerox separated its business process service operations, essentially those operations acquired with the purchase of Affiliated Computer Services, into a new publicly traded company, Conduent. Xerox focuses on its document technology and document outsourcing business, and traded on the NYSE from 1961 to 2021, and the Nasdaq since 2021.

Researchers at Xerox and its Palo Alto Research Center invented several important elements of personal computing, such as the desktop metaphor GUI, the computer mouse and desktop computing.  The concepts were adopted by Apple Inc. and later Microsoft.

History
Xerox was founded in 1906 in Rochester, New York, as The Haloid Photographic Company. It manufactured photographic paper and equipment.

In 1938, Chester Carlson, a physicist working independently, invented a process for printing images using an electrically charged photoconductor-coated metal plate and dry powder "toner". However, it would take more than 20 years of refinement before the first automated machine to make copies was commercialized, using a document feeder, scanning light, and a rotating drum.

Joseph C. Wilson, credited as the "founder of Xerox", took over Haloid from his father. He saw the promise of Carlson's invention and, in 1946, signed an agreement to develop it as a commercial product. Wilson remained as President/CEO of Xerox until 1967 and served as chairman until his death in 1971.

Looking for a term to differentiate its new system, Haloid hired a Greek scholar at Ohio State University and coined the term xerography from two Greek roots meaning "dry writing".
Haloid changed its name to Haloid Xerox in 1958 and then Xerox Corporation in 1961.

Before releasing the 914, Xerox tested the market by introducing a developed version of the prototype hand-operated equipment known as the Flat-plate 1385. The 1385 was not actually a viable copier because of its slowness of operation. As a consequence, it was sold as a platemaker for the Addressograph-Multigraph Multilith 1250 and related sheet-fed offset printing presses in the offset lithography market. It was little more than a high quality, commercially available plate camera mounted as a horizontal rostrum camera, complete with photo-flood lighting and timer. The glass film/plate had been replaced with a selenium-coated aluminum plate. Clever electrics turned this into a quick-developing and reusable substitute for film. A skilled user could produce fast, paper and metal printing plates of a higher quality than almost any other method. Having started as a supplier to the offset lithography duplicating industry, Xerox now set its sights on capturing some of offset's market share.

The 1385 was followed by the first automatic xerographic printer, the Copyflo, in 1955. The Copyflo was a large microfilm printer that could produce positive prints on roll paper from any type of microfilm negative. Following the Copyflo, the process was scaled down to produce the 1824 microfilm printer. At about half the size and weight, this still sizable machine printed onto hand-fed, cut-sheet paper which was pulled through the process by one of two gripper bars. A scaled-down version of this gripper feed system was to become the basis for the 813 desktop copier.

Xerox 914

The company came to prominence in 1959 with the introduction of the Xerox 914, "the most successful single product of all time." The 914, the first plain paper photocopier, was developed by Carlson and John H. Dessauer; it was so popular that by the end of 1961 Xerox had almost $60 million in revenue. The product was sold by an innovative ad campaign showing that even monkeys could make copies at the touch of a button - simplicity would become the foundation of Xerox products and user interfaces. Revenues leaped to over $500 million by 1965.

Xeronic Computer Printer 
In 1956, Haloid formed a joint venture in the UK with Rank Organisation whose Rank Precision Industries Ltd. subsidiary was charged with anglicising the US products. Rank's Precision Industries went on to develop the Xeronic computer printer and Rank Data Systems Ltd was set up to bring the product to market. It used cathode ray tubes to generate the characters and forms that could be overlaid from microfilm images. Initially, they planned for the Ferranti and AEI computer companies to sell the Xeronic as an on-line peripheral, but due to interface problems, Rank switched to a magnetic tape off-line technique. In 1962, Lyons Computers Ltd. placed an order for use with their LEO III computer, and the printer was delivered in 1964. It printed 2,888 lines per minute, slower than the target of 5,000 lpm.

1960s
In the 1960s, Xerox held a dominant position in the photocopier market. In 1960, a xerography research facility called the Wilson Center for Research and Technology was opened in Webster, New York. In 1961, the company changed its name to Xerox Corporation. Xerox common stock (XRX) was listed on the New York Stock Exchange in 1961 and on the Chicago Stock Exchange in 1990.

In 1963, Xerox introduced the Xerox 813, the first desktop plain-paper copier, realizing Carlson's vision of a copier that could fit on anyone's office desk. Ten years later, in 1973, a basic, analogue, color copier, based on the 914, followed. The 914 itself was gradually sped up to become the 420 and 720. The 813 was similarly developed into the 330 and 660 products and, eventually, also the 740 desktop microfiche printer.

Xerox's first foray into duplicating, as distinct from copying, was with the Xerox 2400, introduced in 1966. The model number denoted the number of prints produced in an hour. Although not as fast as offset printing, this machine introduced the industry's first automatic document feeder, paper slitter and perforator, and collator (sorter). This product was soon sped up by fifty percent to become the Xerox 3600 Duplicator.

Meanwhile, a small lab team was borrowing 914 copiers and modifying them. The lab was developing what it called long distance xerography (LDX) to connect two copiers using the public telephone network, so that a document scanned on one machine would print out on the other. The LDX system was introduced in 1964. Many years later, this work came to fruition in the Xerox telecopiers, seminal to today's fax machines. The fax operation in today's multifunction copiers is true to Carlson's original vision for these devices.

In 1968, C. Peter McColough, a longtime executive of Haloid and Xerox, became Xerox's CEO. The same year, the company consolidated its headquarters at Xerox Square in downtown Rochester, New York, with its 30-story Xerox Tower.

Xerox embarked on a series of acquisitions. It purchased University Microfilms International in 1962, Electro-Optical Systems in 1963, and R. R. Bowker in 1967. In 1969, Xerox acquired Scientific Data Systems (SDS), which it renamed the Xerox Data Systems (XDS) division and which produced the Sigma line and its successor XDS 5xx series of mainframe computers in the 1960s and 1970s. Xerox sold XDS to Honeywell in 1975.

1970s
Archie McCardell was named president of the company in 1971. During his tenure, Xerox introduced the Xerox 6500, its first color copier. During McCardell's reign at Xerox, the company announced record revenues, earnings and profits in 1973, 1974, and 1975. John Carrol became a backer, later spreading the company throughout North America.

In the mid-1970s, Xerox introduced the "Xerox 9200 Duplicating System". Originally designed to be sold to print shops to increase their productivity, it was twice a fast as the 3600 duplicator at two impressions per second (7200 per hour). It was followed by the 9400, which did auto-duplexing, and then by the 9500, which was which added variable zoom reduction and electronic lightness/darkness control.

In a 1975 Super Bowl commercial for the 9200, Xerox debuted an advertising campaign featuring "Brother Dominic", a monk who used the 9200 system to save decades of manual copying. Before it was aired, there was some concern that the commercial would be denounced as blasphemous. However, when the commercial was screened for the Archbishop of New York, he found it amusing and gave it his blessing. Dominic, portrayed by Jack Eagle, became the face of Xerox into the 1980s.

Following these years of record profits, in 1975, Xerox resolved an anti-trust suit with the United States Federal Trade Commission (FTC), which at the time was under the direction of Frederic M. Scherer. The Xerox consent decree resulted in the forced licensing of the company's entire patent portfolio, mainly to Japanese competitors. Within four years of the consent decree, Xerox's share of the U.S. copier market dropped from nearly 100% to less than 14%.

In 1979, Xerox purchased Western Union International (WUI) as the basis for its proposed Xerox Telecommunications Network (XTEN) for local-loop communications. However, after three years, in 1982, the company decided the idea was a mistake and sold its assets to MCI at a loss.

1980s
David T. Kearns, a Xerox executive since 1971, took over as CEO in 1982. The company was revived in the 1980s and 1990s, through improvement in quality design and realignment of its product line. Attempting to expand beyond copiers, in 1981 Xerox introduced a line of electronic memory typewriters, the Memorywriter, which gained 20% market share, mostly at the expense of IBM.

In 1983, Xerox bought Crum & Forster, an insurance company, and formed Xerox Financial Services (XFS) in 1984.

In 1985, Xerox sold all of its publishing subsidiaries including University Microfilms and R. R. Bowker.

The 6500 color copier was also introduced in 1986. The first one was sold in Philadelphia by Jack Schneider.

1990s

In 1990, Paul Allaire, a Xerox executive since 1966, succeeded David Kearns, who had reached mandatory retirement age. Allaire disentangled Xerox from the financial services industry.

The development of digital photocopiers in the 1990s and a revamp of the entire product range again gave Xerox a technical lead over its competitors. In 1990, Xerox released the DocuTech Production Publisher Model 135, ushering in print-on-demand. Digital photocopiers were essentially high-end laser printers with integrated scanners. Soon, additional features such as network printing and faxing were added to many models, known as Multi Function Machines, or just MFMs, which were able to be attached to computer networks. Xerox worked to turn its product into a service, providing a complete document service to companies including supply, maintenance, configuration, and user support.

To reinforce this image, the company introduced a corporate signature in 1994, "The Document Company", above its main logo and introduced a red digital X. The digital X symbolized the transition of documents between the paper and digital worlds.

In April 1999, Allaire was succeeded by Richard Thoman, who had been brought in from IBM in 1997 as president. The first "outsider" to head Xerox, Thoman resigned in 2000.

2000s
After Thoman's resignation, Allaire again resumed the position of CEO and served until the appointment of Anne M. Mulcahy, another long-term Xerox executive. Xerox's turnaround was largely led by Mulcahy, who was appointed president in May 2000, CEO in August 2001 and chairman in January 2002. She launched an aggressive turnaround plan that returned Xerox to full-year profitability by the end of 2002, along with decreasing debt, increasing cash, and continuing to invest in research and development.

In 2000, Xerox acquired Tektronix color printing and imaging division in Wilsonville, Oregon, for US$925 million. This led to the current Xerox Phaser line of products as well as Xerox solid ink printing technology.

In September 2004, Xerox celebrated the 45th anniversary of the Xerox 914. More than 200,000 units were made around the world between 1959 and 1976, the year production of the 914 was stopped. Today, the 914 is part of American history as an artifact in the Smithsonian Institution.

In November 2006, Xerox completed the acquisition of XMPie. XMPie, a provider of software for cross-media, variable data one-to-one marketing, was the first acquisition of Xerox to remain independent entity, as a Xerox company and not a division, and to this day is led by its original founder Jacob Aizikowitz.

In October 2008, Xerox Canada Ltd. was named one of Greater Toronto's Top Employers by Mediacorp Canada Inc., which was announced by the Toronto Star newspaper.

On July 1, 2009, Ursula Burns succeeded Anne Mulcahy as CEO of Xerox. Burns was the first African American woman to head a company the size of Xerox.

On September 28, 2009, Xerox announced the intended acquisition of Affiliated Computer Services, a services and outsourcing company, for $6.4 Billion. The acquisition was completed in February 2010. Xerox said it paid 4.935 Xerox shares and $18.60 cash for each share of ACS, totaling $6.4 billion, or $63.11 a share for the company.

2010s
In May 2011, Xerox acquired NewField IT for an undisclosed sum.

In December 2013, Xerox sold their Wilsonville, Oregon solid ink product design, engineering and chemistry group and related assets previously acquired from Tektronix to 3D Systems for $32.5 million in cash.

In December 2014, Xerox sold the IT Outsourcing business it had acquired in 2009 from Affiliated Computer Services to Atos for $1.05 billion.  This move was taken due to the relatively slow growth of this business relative to some other Xerox units.

In January 2016, Xerox—reportedly under pressure from activist shareholder and corporate raider Carl Icahn—announced that by the end of the year it would spin off its business services unit, largely made up of Affiliated Computer Services, into its own publicly traded company. The name and management of the new company had not been determined at the time of the announcement. Icahn will appoint three members of the new company's board of directors, and he will choose a person to advise its search for a CEO. In June, the company announced that the document management business would retain the name Xerox and the new business services company would be named Conduent. It also announced that Ashok Vemuri will serve as Conduent's CEO and that Icahn will control three seats on the new company's board. It continues to seek a CEO for Xerox; in May, Burns announced her intention to step down as CEO but continue as chairman of the document management business. In June 2016, the company announced that Jeff Jacobson will become the new CEO following the completion of the company's planned separation. This became effective in January 2017.

On January 31, 2018, Xerox announced that Fujifilm had agreed to acquire a 50.1% controlling stake in the company for US$6.1 billion, which was to be combined into their existing joint venture Fuji Xerox (having a value of $18 billion post-acquisition).

On May 1, 2018, it was announced that Chairman Robert Keegan and CEO Jeff Jacobson and four other directors would resign as part of a deal with investors Carl Icahn and Darwin Deason, who had mounted a proxy fight to oppose the Fujifilm deal. On May 4, Xerox backed away from the deal after stipulations about ceasing litigation were not met. Icahn and Deason responded with an open letter to shareholders blaming the board and management.
On May 13 a new deal was reached that additionally cancelled the Fujifilm transaction.

In November 2019, Xerox began to pursue a hostile takeover of PC and printer manufacturer HP Inc., declaring its intent to "engage directly" with shareholders after HP rejected two unsolicited bids for the company. Xerox stated in January 2020 that it would pursue the replacement of HP's board. HP has criticized the proposed purchase as a "flawed value exchange" based on "overstated synergies", and instituted a shareholder rights plan and other measures designed to quell the bid, which the company believed was being orchestrated by Icahn.

2020s 
In February 2020, Xerox announced the hiring of Tali Rosman as VP of Xerox's 3D business. She joins Xerox from NICE, where she was vice president and head of business operations for the Americas. She will report to CTO Naresh Shanker.

On March 5, HP revealed that its board of directors has unanimously declined Xerox's $24 a share cash-and-stock offer.

On March 13, Xerox revealed that they are putting their campaign to acquire HP on hold by postponing additional presentations, interviews with the press and meetings with HP shareholders. Xerox Vice Chairman and Chief Executive John Visentin cited the COVID-19 pandemic as a main reason and said, "In light of the escalating Covid-19 pandemic, Xerox needs to prioritize health and safety of its employees, customers, partners and affiliates over and above all considerations, including its proposal to acquire HP."

On March 31, 2020, Xerox abolished its $24 a share offer.

In September 2020, Xerox opened its North Carolina Center of Excellence in Cary, North Carolina. The Center includes the research and development operations, the 3-D printing lab, and th eXerox Digital eXperience IT organization.

In September 2021, Xerox announced it was transferring its stock ticker from the New York Stock Exchange to the Nasdaq after 60 years. The move, as described by Visentin, was to "[challenge] the status quo by developing and leveraging new innovations to create solutions that address major secular challenges across industries", and was viewed as part of Xerox's transition into software. The transfer went into effect on September 21, 2021.

Digital printing
The laser printer was invented in 1969 by Xerox researcher Gary Starkweather by modifying a Xerox 7000 copier. Xerox management was afraid the product version of Starkweather's invention, which became the 9700, would negatively impact their copier business so the innovation sat in limbo until IBM launched the 3800 laser printer in 1976.

The first commercial non-impact printer was the Xerox 1200, introduced in 1973, based on the 3600 copier. It had an optical character generator designed by optical engineer Phil Chen.

In 1977, following IBM's laser printer introduction, the Xerox 9700 was introduced. Laser printing eventually became a multibillion-dollar business for Xerox.

In the late 1970s, Xerox introduced the "Xerox 350 color slide system." This product allowed the customer to create digital word and graphic 35-millimetre slides. Many of the concepts used in today's "Photo Shop" programs were pioneered with this technology.

In 1980, Xerox announced the 5700 laser printing system, a much smaller version of their 9700, but with revolutionary touch-screen capabilities and multiple media input (word processing disks, IBM magcards, etc.) and printer 'finishing' options. This product was allegedly never intended to make the commercial markets due to its development cost, but rather to show the innovation of Xerox. It took off with many customers, but was soon replaced with its smaller and lower cost Xerox 2700 Distributed Electronic Printer offering in 1982.

Palo Alto Research Center

In 1970, under company president C. Peter McColough, Xerox opened the Xerox Palo Alto Research Center, known as Xerox PARC. The facility developed many modern computing technologies such as the graphical user interface (GUI), laser printing, WYSIWYG text editors and Ethernet. From these inventions, Xerox PARC created the Xerox Alto in 1973, a small minicomputer similar to a modern workstation or personal computer. This machine can be considered the first true Personal Computer, given its versatile combination of a cathode-ray-type screen, mouse-type pointing device, and a QWERTY-type alphanumeric keyboard. But the Alto was never commercially sold, as Xerox itself could not see the sales potential of it. It was, however, installed in Xerox's own offices, worldwide and those of the US Government and military, who could see the potential. Within these sites the individual workstations were connected together by Xerox's own unique LAN, The Ethernet. Data was sent around this system of heavy, yellow, low loss coaxial cable using the packet data system. In addition, PARC also developed one of the earliest internetworking protocol suites, the PARC Universal Packet (PUP).

In 1979, Steve Jobs made a deal with Xerox's venture capital division: He would let them invest $1 million in exchange for a look at the technology they were working on. Jobs and the others saw the commercial potential of the WIMP (Window, Icon, Menu, and Pointing device) system and redirected development of the Apple Lisa to incorporate these technologies. Jobs is quoted as saying, "They just had no idea what they had." In 1980, Jobs invited several key PARC researchers to join his company so that they could fully develop and implement their ideas.

In 1981, Xerox released a system similar to the Alto, the Xerox Star. It was the first commercial system to incorporate technologies that have subsequently become commonplace in personal computers, such as a bitmapped display, window-based GUI, mouse, Ethernet networking, file servers, print servers and e-mail. The Xerox Star and its successor the Xerox Daybreak, despite their technological breakthroughs, did not sell well due to its high price, costing $16,000 per unit. A typical Xerox Star-based office, complete with network and printers, would have cost $100,000.

In the mid-1980s, Apple considered buying Xerox; however, a deal was never reached. Apple instead bought rights to the Alto GUI and adapted it into a more affordable personal computer, aimed towards the business and education markets. The Apple Macintosh was released in 1984, and was the first personal computer to popularize the GUI and mouse among the public.

In 2002, PARC was spun off into an independent wholly-owned subsidiary of Xerox.

Chief executives

Products and services

Xerox manufactures and sells a wide variety of office equipment including scanners, printers, and multifunction systems that scan, print, copy, email and fax. These model families include WorkCentre, Phaser, and ColorQube. For the graphic communications and commercial print industries, the Xerox product portfolio includes high-volume, digital printing presses, production printers, and wide format printers that use xerographic and inkjet printing technologies. Products include the iGen, Nuvera, DocuPrint, and Impika series, as well as the Trivor, iPrint, and Rialto (inkjet) machines.

Corporate structure

Although Xerox is a global brand, it maintained a joint venture from 1962 to 2021, Fuji Xerox, with Japanese photographic firm Fuji Photo Film Co. to develop, produce and sell in the Asia-Pacific region. Fujifilm announced in January 2020 that it would not renew its technology agreement with Xerox, with Fuji Xerox being renamed to Fujifilm Business Innovation in April 2021.

Xerox India, formerly Modi Xerox, is Xerox's Indian subsidiary derived from a joint venture formed between Dr. Bhupendra Kumar Modi and Rank Xerox in 1983. Xerox obtained a majority stake in 1999 and aims to buy out the remaining shareholders.

NewField IT is a wholly owned subsidiary of Xerox that implements and supports third-party software for MPS providers.

Xerox now sponsors the Factory Ducati Team in the World Superbike Championship, under the name of the "Xerox Ducati".

Rank Xerox

The European company Rank Xerox, later extended to Asia and Africa, has been fully owned by Xerox Corporation since 1997. The Rank Xerox name was discontinued following the buyout, and the Rank Xerox Research Centre was renamed to the Xerox Research Centre Europe. International Internet company NAVER acquired Xerox Research Centre Europe in June 2017.

Accounting irregularities
On May 31, 2001, Xerox Corporation announced that its auditors, KPMG LLP, had certified Xerox's financial statements for the three years ended December 31, 2000; the financials included some restatements. On March 31, 2002, Xerox restated its financials which reflected the reallocation of equipment sales revenue of more than $2 billion. On April 11, 2002, the U.S. Securities and Exchange Commission filed a complaint against Xerox. The complaint alleged Xerox deceived the public between 1997 and 2000 by employing several "accounting maneuvers," the most significant of which was a change in which Xerox recorded revenue from copy machine leases – recognizing a "sale" when a lease contract was signed, instead of recognizing revenue over the entire length of the contract. At issue was when the revenue was recognized, not the validity of the revenue. Xerox's restatement only changed what year the revenue was recognized. On December 20, 2002, Xerox Corporation reported that it had discovered an error in the calculation of its non-cash interest expense related to a debt instrument and associated interest rate swap agreements, resulted in after-tax understatement of interest expense of approximately $5 million to $6 million or less than 1 cent per share in each of the four quarters of 2001 and for the first three quarters of 2002.

In response to the SEC's complaint, Xerox Corporation neither admitted nor denied wrongdoing. It agreed to pay a $10 million penalty and to restate its financial results for the years 1997 through 2000. On June 5, 2003, six Xerox senior executives accused of securities fraud settled their issues with the SEC and neither admitted nor denied wrongdoing. They agreed to pay $22 million in penalties, disgorgement, and interest. The company received approval to settle the securities lawsuit in 2008.

On January 29, 2003, the SEC filed a complaint against Xerox's auditors, KPMG, alleging four partners in the "Big Five" accounting firm permitted Xerox to "cook the books" to fill a $3 billion "gap" in revenue and $1.4 billion "gap" in pre-tax earnings. In April 2005 KPMG settled with the SEC by paying a US$22.48 million fine. Meanwhile, Xerox paid a civil penalty of $10 million. As part of the settlement KPMG neither admits nor denies wrongdoings.

During a settlement with the Securities and Exchange Commission, Xerox began to revamp itself once more. As a symbol of this transformation, the relative size of the word "Xerox" was increased in proportion to "The Document Company" on the corporate signature, and the latter was dropped altogether in September 2004, along with the digital X. However, the digital X and "The Document Company" were still used by Fuji Xerox until April 2008.

Character substitution bug
In 2013, German computer scientist David Kriesel (de) discovered an error in a Xerox WorkCentre 7535 copier. The device would substitute number digits in scanned documents, even when OCR was turned off. For instance, a cost table in a scanned document had an entry of 85.40, instead of the original sum of 65.40. After unsuccessfully trying to resolve this issue with Xerox's customer support, he publicised his findings on his blog. Providing example pages that would lead to the bug occurring, it was confirmed that this bug was reproducible on a wide variety of Xerox WorkCentre and other high-end Xerox copiers.

The source of the error was a bug in the JBIG2 implementation, which is an image compression standard that makes use of pattern matching to encode identical characters only once. While this provides a high level of compression, it is susceptible to errors in identifying similar characters.

A possible workaround was published by Kriesel, which involved setting the image quality from "normal" to "higher" or "high". Shortly afterwards, it was found that the same fix had been suggested in the printer manual, which mentioned the occurrence of character substitutions in "normal mode", indicating that Xerox was aware of the software error. In Xerox's initial response to a growing interest by the media, the error was described as occurring rarely and only when factory settings had been changed. After Kriesel provided evidence that the error was also occurring in all three image quality modes (normal, higher and high) including the factory defaults, Xerox corrected their statement and released a software patch to eliminate the problem. Despite the problem being present in some instances also in higher quality mode, Xerox advises users that they can use this mode as an alternative to applying the patch.

Trademark
The word xerox is used as a synonym for photocopy (both as a noun and a verb) in many areas: for example, "I xeroxed the document and placed it on your desk" or "Please make a xeroxed copy of the articles and hand them out a week before the exam". Though both are common, the company does not condone such uses of its trademark, and is particularly concerned about the ongoing use of Xerox as a verb as this places the trademark in danger of being declared a generic word by the courts. The company is engaged in an ongoing advertising and media campaign to convince the public that Xerox should not be used as a verb.

To this end, the company has written to publications that have used Xerox as a verb. It has also purchased print advertisements using "xerox" as a verb, claiming that "you cannot 'xerox' a document, but you can copy it on a Xerox Brand copying machine". Xerox Corporation continues to protect its trademark in most if not all trademark categories. Despite their efforts, many dictionaries continue to include the use of "xerox" as a verb, including the Oxford English Dictionary. In 2012, the Intellectual Property Appellate Board (IPAB) of India declared "xerox" a non-generic term after "almost 50 years (1963–2009) of continued existence on the register without challenge, and with proof of almost 44 years of use evident (1965–2009)", but as of 2015, most Indians still use it as a synonym for photocopying.

The company has also advertised its trademark concerns, in an attempt to persuade journalists and others not to use "Xerox" as a verb.

See also
 Faxlore, often called 'Xeroxlore'

Citations

General references
 Ellis, Charles D., Joe Wilson and the Creation of Xerox, Wiley, 2006, .
 Owen, David, Copies in Seconds: How a Lone Inventor and an Unknown Company Created the Biggest Communication Breakthrough Since Gutenberg—Chester Carlson and the Birth of the Xerox Machine, Simon & Schuster, 2004, .

External links 

 

 
1906 establishments in New York (state)
American companies established in 1906
Brands that became generic
British Royal Warrant holders
Companies based in Norwalk, Connecticut
Companies formerly listed on the New York Stock Exchange
Companies listed on the Nasdaq
Computer printer companies
Electronics companies established in 1906
Electronics companies of the United States
History of Rochester, New York
Manufacturing companies based in Connecticut
Multinational companies headquartered in the United States
National Medal of Technology recipients
Peabody Award winners
Photocopiers
Printing companies of the United States
Printing press manufacturers
Purveyors to the Court of Denmark